Christopher Hussey may refer to:
Chris Hussey (born 1989), English footballer 
Christopher Hussey (died 1686) (1599–1686), English colonial official
Christopher Hussey (historian) (1889–1970), British architectural historian